Tuati Peak is a peak, 2,595 m, which rises above the north wall of Mitchell Glacier at the glacier head, in Royal Society Range, Victoria Land. Named in 1993 by New Zealand Geographic Board (NZGB) after Tuati, the Maori name of a sailor known as John Stewart, the first New Zealander to view the icy coast of Antarctica. He sailed on the ship Vincennes, the flagship of the U.S. Exploring Expedition, 1838–42, led by Lieutenant Charles Wilkes, USN.

Mountains of Victoria Land
Scott Coast